Z-DNA-binding protein 1, also known as DNA-dependent activator of IFN-regulatory factors (DAI) and DLM-1, is a protein that in humans is encoded by the ZBP1 gene.

ZBP1 is also an abbreviation for chicken or rat β-actin zipcode-binding protein 1, a homolog of the human insulin-like growth factor 2 mRNA-binding protein 1 (IMP-1) and murine CRD-BP,  the proteins involved in mRNA transport (RNA-binding proteins, RBPs).

Function 

DLM1 encodes a Z-DNA binding protein. Z-DNA formation is a dynamic process, largely controlled by the amount of supercoiling. ZBP1 recognizes DNA in the cytoplasm as an antiviral mechanism. Viral life cycles often include steps where DNA is exposed in the cytoplasm. DNA is normally contained in the nucleus of a cell, and therefore cells use proteins like ZBP1 as an indicator of a viral infection. Once ZBP1 is activated, it increases the production of antiviral cytokines such as interferon beta. DLM1 then binds to cytosolic Viral DNA using two Z-DNA-binding domains (Zα and Zβ) at its N-terminus along with a DNA binding domain (D3).

The role of ZBP1 in DNA sensing has been questioned. It has been found to sense Influenza A Virus (IAV) infection and induce cell death. Since DNA is not synthesized in any stage of IAV life cycle, DNA sensing playing a role in this context is unlikely. However, recent investigation has found that ZBP1 is capable of sensing Z-form RNAs produced during IAV infection, cumulating in a form of caspase independent, inflammatory cell death called necroptosis. 

A follow up study identified that ZBP1 senses the IAV ribonucleoprotein complex to induce cell death. A more recent study has identified transcription factor IRF1 as the upstream regulator of ZBP1 expression. 

Zipcode binding protein 1 (ZBP1) was shown to regulate dendritogenesis (dendrite formation) in hippocampal neurons. This protein is different from the nucleic acid sensor ZBP1.

References

Further reading